Bergaris halim is a species of moth of the family Cossidae. It is found on Sulawesi in Indonesia.

References

Moths described in 2011
Zeuzerinae